Terézia Kulová (born 2 April 1997) is a Slovak footballer who plays as a defender for Slovan Bratislava in the Slovak Women's First League and has appeared for the Slovakia women's national team.

Career
Kulová has been capped for the Slovakia national team, appearing for the team during the 2019 FIFA Women's World Cup qualifying cycle.

References

External links
 
 
 

1997 births
Living people
Slovak women's footballers
Slovakia women's international footballers
Women's association football defenders
ŠK Slovan Bratislava (women) players